AS Rivière du Rempart is a Mauritian football club based in Mapou, Rivière du Rempart District. They play in the Mauritian Premier League, the top division in Mauritian football.

They have never won the league or any domestic cups.

Ground
Their home stadium is Stade Anjalay (cap. 15,000) in Belle Vue Maurel, Pamplemousses District. They share this stadium with Pamplemousses SC.

External links
zerozerofootball Profile

References

Football clubs in Mauritius
2000 establishments in Mauritius